Nazran is a town in the Republic of Ingushetia, Russia.

Nazran may also refer to:
Nazran Urban Okrug, a municipal formation which the town of republic significance of Nazran in the Republic of Ingushetia, Russia is incorporated as
Nazran Airport, an airport in the Republic of Ingushetia, Russia
Govinder Nazran (1964–2008), English artist